Satibarzanes (died 330 BC), a Persian, was satrap of Aria under Darius III, king of Persia.

In 330 BC, Alexander the Great, marching through the borders of Aria on his way from Hyrcania against the Parthians, was met at a city named Susia by Satibarzanes, who made submission to him, and was rewarded for it by the restoration of his satrapy. In order to prevent the commission of any hostilities against the Arians by the Macedonian troops which were following from the west, Alexander left behind with Satibarzanes forty horse-dartmen, under the command of Anaxippus. These, however, together with their commander, were soon after murdered by the satrap, who excited the Arians to rebellion, and gathered his forces together at the city of Artacoana.

On the approach of Alexander, he fled to join the traitor Bessus; and the city, after a short siege, was captured by the Macedonians. Towards the end of the same year (330 BC), Alexander, heard that Satibarzanes had again entered Aria with 2000 horses, supplied by Bessus, and had excited the Arians to another revolt. According to Arrian, upon this, he sent a force against him, led by Artabazus, Erigyius, Caranus, and Andronicus of Olynthus.  In a battle which ensued, and of which the issue was yet doubtful, Satibarzanes came forward and defied any one of the enemy's generals to single combat. The challenge was accepted by Erigyius, and Satibarzanes was slain.

References
Smith, William (editor); Dictionary of Greek and Roman Biography and Mythology, "Satibarzanes", Boston, (1867)

Notes

External links
 Livius.org: Satibarzanes

Opponents of Alexander the Great
History of Herat
Year of birth unknown
4th-century BC Iranian people
History of Herat Province
Satraps of the Achaemenid Empire
330 BC deaths